The Great Hungarian Plain (also known as Alföld or Great Alföld,   or ) is a plain occupying the majority of the modern territory of Hungary. It is the largest part of the wider Pannonian Plain. (However, the Great Hungarian plain was not part of the ancient Roman province Pannonia). Its territory significantly shrank due to its eastern and southern boundaries being rewritten by the new political borders created after World War I when the Treaty of Trianon was signed in 1920.

Boundaries 

Its boundaries are the Carpathians in the north and east, the Transdanubian Mountains and the Dinaric Alps in the southwest, and approximately the Sava river in the south.

Geography

Plain in Hungary 

The highest point of the plain is Hoportyó; the lowest point is the Tisza River. The terrain ranges from flat to rolling plains.

The most important Hungarian writers inspired by and associated with the plain are Ferenc Móra and Zsigmond Móricz, as well as the poets Sándor Petőfi and Gyula Juhász.

Hungarian scientists born on the plain include Zoltán Bay, physicist; János Irinyi, chemist, inventor of the noiseless match; János Kabay, pharmacologist; Gábor Kátai, physician and pharmacist; and Frigyes Korányi, physician and pulmonologist.

The most important river of the plain is the Tisza.

The notable cities and towns with medicinal baths are Debrecen, Berekfürdő, Cserkeszőlő, Gyula, Hajdúszoboszló, Orosháza, Szentes and Szolnok.

The part of the plain located in Hungary comprises the following areas:

 Mezőföld
 Sárrét
 Sárköz
 Drávamellék
 Kiskunság
 Jászság
 Pest Plain
 Heves Plain
 Borsodi-Mezőség
 Bodrogköz
 Tiszahát
 Szatmár Plain
 Maros-Körös köze
 Körös-vidék
 Nagykunság
 Hortobágy National Park
 Hajdúság
 Nyírség

Plain in Serbia 
The term is used in Serbia to denote the Hungarian portion of the Pannonian plain.

The portion of the Pannonian plain in Serbia is mostly divided into 3 large geographical areas: Bačka, Banat and Srem (Syrmia), most of which are located in the Vojvodina province.

Plain in Croatia 
The term is rarely used in Croatia, and is usually associated there with the geography of Hungary.

Parts of Pannonian Croatia can be considered an extension of Alföld, particularly eastern Slavonia and the connected parts of Syrmia.

Plain in Slovakia 
The portion of the plain located in Slovakia is known as the Eastern Slovak Lowland.

Plain in Ukraine 
The part of the plain located in Ukraine is known as the Transcarpathian Lowland.

Plain in Romania 
In Romania, the plain (Rom. câmp or câmpia, from Lat. campus) includes the regions of Banat and Crişana. It is referred to in Romanian as The Western Plain.

History

Prehistoric culture 
During the prehistoric era, the Great Hungarian Plain was a place of cultural and technological changes, as well as an important meeting point of cultures of Eastern and Western Europe. It is a region of great archaeological importance to major European cultural transitions.

Agriculture began in the Great Hungarian Plain with the Early Neolithic Körös culture, located in present-day Serbia, 6.000-5.500 B.C.E.  followed 5.500 B.C.E. by the Linear Pottery culture (LBK) which later became the dominant agricultural culture of Europe.  The LBK was followed by the Lengyel culture in the Late Neolithic 5000-3400 BC.

During the Early Bronze Age (2.800 - 1.800 BC), the growing demand for metal ores in Europe resulted in the new pan-European and intercontinental trade networks. During that period cultures of the Great Hungarian Plain incorporated many elements from the other cultures of Bronze Age Near Eastern, Steppe and Central Europe

During the early Iron Age (first millennium BC), a variant of the Central European Hallstatt culture inhabited Transdanubia, while pre-Scythian and later Scythian cultures were found in the eastern region of the Great Hungarian Plain.

In 2014, a major study of DNA from burials in the Great Hungarian Plain was published.  The 5,000-year record indicated significant genomic shifts at the beginning of the Neolithic, Bronze and Iron Ages, with periods of stability in between. The earliest Neolithic genome was similar to other European hunter-gatherers and surprisingly there was no evidence of lactase persistence at that period.  The most recent samples, from the Iron Age, showed an eastern genomic influence contemporary with introduced Steppe burial rites.  There was also a transition towards lighter pigmentation.

Nomadic migrations and conquests  
The Hungarian plain became the heartland of the Eurasian nomads, being in its natural environment similar to the Pontic–Caspian steppe. The plain had formed the base for Huns, Avars, Magyars, Cumans, Jasz people and other nomadic tribes from the Eurasian Steppe.

See also 
Berehove Raion
Eurasian Steppe
Little Hungarian Plain
Pannonian Basin
Pannonian Steppe
Steppe Route
Vienna Basin

References

External links 

Körös Regional Archaeological Project: Neolithic and Copper Age archaeology in the Great Hungarian Plain

 
Eurasian Steppe
Historical regions in Hungary
Historical regions in the Kingdom of Hungary
Geography of Vojvodina
Plains of Croatia
Plains of Hungary
Plains of Romania
Plains of Serbia
Plains of Slovakia
Plains of Ukraine
Pannonian Plain